The Malaysia national badminton team is a badminton team that plays for Malaysia in international competitions. The men's team has enjoyed immense success, having won the Thomas Cup five times, most recently in 1992 and became runner-up nine times. In the Uber Cup competition, the women's team with the best results in 1975, 2004, 2008 and 2010 edition making it to the quarter-finals. Malaysia competed in the Sudirman Cup since 1989 with the best result in 2009 and 2021, placed third.

Competitive record

International

Thomas & Uber Cup

Sudirman Cup

Commonwealth Games

Asia

Asia Championships

Asian Games

Southeast Asian Games

Players

Current squad
As of 19 December 2022 :

Male players
Aaron Chia
Chia Wei Jie
Goh Sze Fei
Liew Daren
Lee Zii Jia
Leong Jun Hao
Nur Izzuddin
Ng Tze Yong
Ong Yew Sin
Aidil Sholeh
Soh Wooi Yik
Teo Ee Yi
Female players
Chan Wen Tse
Anna Cheong
Goh Jin Wei
Myisha Mohd Khairul
Thinaah Muralitharan
Pearly Tan
Tan Zhing Yi
Teoh Mei Xing
Valeree Siow
Low Yeen Yuan

Previous squad

Thomas Cup
2020 Thomas Cup squad
2018 Thomas Cup squad
2016 Thomas Cup squad
2014 Thomas Cup squad
2012 Thomas Cup squad
2010 Thomas Cup squad
2008 Thomas Cup squad

Uber Cup
2020 Uber Cup squad
2018 Uber Cup squad
2016 Uber Cup squad
2014 Uber Cup squad
2010 Uber Cup squad
2008 Uber Cup squad

Sudirman Cup
2021 Sudirman Cup
2019 Sudirman Cup
2017 Sudirman Cup
2015 Sudirman Cup

References

Badminton
National badminton teams
Badminton in Malaysia